An-Nasir al-Hasan (1457 - June 24, 1523) was an imam of the Zaidi state in Yemen, who exerted a limited authority in the northern Yemeni highland in 1495–1523.

Al-Hasan bin Izz al-Din was the son of the forceful imam al-Hadi Izz al-Din. After the death of the latter in 1495, al-Hasan proclaimed his call for the imamate under the name an-Nasir al-Hasan. He inherited his father's love for learning, but hardly his political skills. Zaidi tradition depicts him positively as a shelter for widows and orphans, and a haven for the weak. Nevertheless, an-Nasir al-Hasan could only control a limited area in the northern highlands. For many years he had to resist the rival imam al-Mansur Muhammad (d. 1505). Al-Mansur was captured and poisoned by the Tahiride Sultan Amir in 1504, and the Tahirides seized San'a. In later years, an-Nasir al-Hasan was eclipsed by a new powerful imam, al-Mutawakkil Yahya Sharaf ad-Din (r. 1506–1555). He died in obscurity in 1523 and was buried in Falala. He sired nine sons, Muhammad, Izz al-Din, Majd ad-Din, Da'ud, Ahmad, Salah, Yahya, Taj ad-Din, and Ali. Majd ad-Din made his call for the imamate after his father's demise, but was unsuccessful and died in 1536 without ever holding political power.

See also

 Imams of Yemen
 Rassids
 History of Yemen

References

Zaydi imams of Yemen
1457 births
1523 deaths
15th century in Yemen
16th century in Yemen
15th-century Arabs
16th-century Arabs